1690 Mayrhofer, provisional designation , is a carbonaceous asteroid from the outer region of the asteroid belt, approximately 32 kilometers in diameter. It was discovered on 8 November 1948, by French astronomer Marguerite Laugier at Nice Observatory in south-east France. It was later named after Austrian amateur astronomer Karl Mayrhofer.

Orbit and classification 

The C-type asteroid orbits the Sun in the outer main-belt at a distance of 2.7–3.3 AU once every 5 years and 4 months (1,935 days). Its orbit has an eccentricity of 0.10 and an inclination of 13° with respect to the ecliptic.

Physical characteristics

Rotation period 

In November 2006, a rotational lightcurve of Mayrhofer was obtained from observations taken by French amateur astronomer Pierre Antonini, giving a rotation period of 22.194 hours with a brightness variation of 0.45 in magnitude. Photometric observation in the R-band at the Palomar Transient Factory in November 2011, gave a shorter period of 19.0808 hours with an amplitude of 0.30 magnitude.

Diameter and albedo 

According to the surveys carried out by the Infrared Astronomical Satellite IRAS, the Japanese Akari satellite, and NASA's Wide-field Infrared Survey Explorer with its subsequent NEOWISE mission, Mayrhofer measures between 31.18 and 33.81 kilometers in diameter, and its surface has an albedo between 0.056 and 0.082. The Collaborative Asteroid Lightcurve Link derives an albedo of 0.064 and a diameter of 31.63 kilometers based on an absolute magnitude of 11.1.

Naming 

Proposed by German catholic priest and amateur astronomer Otto Kippes, this minor planet was named after Austrian amateur astronomer Karl Mayrhofer (1903–1982). He lived in the Austrian town of Ried im Innkreis and was known for his calculations of orbital elements for asteroids. Naming citation was published on 1 October 1980.

References

External links 
 Asteroid Lightcurve Database (LCDB), query form (info )
 Dictionary of Minor Planet Names, Google books
 Asteroids and comets rotation curves, CdR – Observatoire de Genève, Raoul Behrend
 Discovery Circumstances: Numbered Minor Planets (1)-(5000) – Minor Planet Center
 
 

 

001690
Discoveries by Marguerite Laugier
Named minor planets
19481108